Humčani is a village in the municipality of Nevesinje, Republika Srpska, Bosnia and Herzegovina.

References

Populated places in Nevesinje
Villages in Republika Srpska